Wet Hot American Summer: First Day of Camp is a comedy streaming television miniseries written by David Wain and Michael Showalter, and directed by Wain. First Day of Camp is the second installment in the Wet Hot American Summer franchise. The eight-episode Netflix series is a prequel to Wain's 2001 film Wet Hot American Summer, a parody of teen sex comedies which has since developed a cult following. Although many of the original film's ensemble cast have gone on to high-profile work, all of the then-adult actors returned for this series, playing even younger versions of their original roles. The episodes were released for online viewing at the end of July 2015.

Cast

Returning cast from the film (in alphabetical order)

 Elizabeth Banks as Lindsay (6 episodes)
 H. Jon Benjamin as Mitch/Can of Mixed Vegetables (4 episodes)
 Michael Ian Black as McKinley (7 episodes)
 Bradley Cooper as Ben (7 episodes)
 Judah Friedlander as Ron Von Kleinenstein (2 episodes)
 Janeane Garofalo as Beth (7 episodes)
 Nina Hellman as Nancy (6 episodes)
 Joe Lo Truglio as Neil (5 episodes)
 Ken Marino as Victor (5 episodes)
 Christopher Meloni as Gene Jenkinson/Jonas Jurgenson, a former military man (6 episodes)
 A. D. Miles as Gary (5 episodes)
 Marguerite Moreau as Katie (8 episodes)
 Zak Orth as J.J. (8 episodes)
 David Hyde Pierce as Assoc. Prof. Henry Neumann who secluded himself in a cabin next to the summer camp after having a nervous breakdown at the university which caused him to be fired (2 episodes)
 Amy Poehler as Susie (7 episodes)
 Paul Rudd as Andy (8 episodes)
 Marisa Ryan as Abby (3 episodes)
 Molly Shannon as Gail (7 episodes)
 Michael Showalter as Coop (8 episodes)
 Showalter also portrays U.S. President Ronald Reagan
 Kevin Sussman as Steve (3 episodes)

New cast

 Jason Schwartzman as Greg, Boys' Head Counselor (7 episodes)
 Lake Bell as Donna Berman, Coop's love interest (7 episodes)
 David Bloom as Kevin, a kid at the camp (7 episodes)
 Thomas Barbusca as Drew, Kevin's nemesis (7 episodes)
 George Dalton as Arty "The Beekeeper" Solomon (7 episodes)
 Samm Levine as the voice of Arty
 Michael Blaiklock as Danny (7 episodes)
 David Wain as Yaron, an Israeli counselor (6 episodes)
 John Slattery as Claude Dumet, a renowned Broadway actor-director (6 episodes)
 Michaela Watkins as Rhonda, a professional choreographer (6 episodes)
 Josh Charles as Blake, Camp Tigerclaw counselor and Katie's boyfriend (6 episodes)
 Rich Sommer as Graham, one of Blake's cronies (5 episodes)
 Eric Nenninger as Warner, one of Blake's cronies (5 episodes)
 Hailey Sole as Amy, Kevin's love interest (5 episodes)
 Chris Pine as Eric, a reclusive musician (5 episodes)
 Jon Hamm as The Falcon, a hired assassin (4 episodes)
 Randall Park as Jeff, a city hall records clerk who's in love with Gail (4 episodes)
 Michael Cera as Jim Stansel, Beth and Greg's lawyer (3 episodes)
 Kristen Wiig as Courtney, a snobby Camp Tigerclaw counselor (3 episodes)

Guest appearances
 Jordan Peele as Alan, Lindsay's boss
 Paul Scheer as Dave, Lindsay's colleague
 Jayma Mays as Jessica, Lindsay's colleague
 "Weird Al" Yankovic as Jackie Brazen, a famous hypnotist
 Beth Dover as Shari, Neil's high school sweetheart
 John Early as Logan St. Bogan
 Bruce Greenwood as Bill Martinson, powerful lawyer
 Rob Huebel as Brodfard Gilroy, Henry's rival
 Richard Schiff as Dean Fairchild, Henry's superior

Episodes

Production
After years of speculation and reports on a possible sequel to Wet Hot American Summer, shooting began on the miniseries in January 2015. The entire adult cast of the film returned in the same roles. Much of the film was shot in Los Angeles. Working around the availability of the cast members, many of whom had seen a significant rise in stardom since the original film, was difficult; some sources report that Bradley Cooper, who plays Ben, had to shoot all of his scenes in one day, although star and co-writer Michael Showalter has since denied this claim.

Along with the series, a making-of documentary on Wet Hot American Summer, titled Hurricane of Fun: The Making of Wet Hot, was released on Netflix on July 24, 2015, consisting of behind the scenes interviews and footage shot during the filming of the movie.

Sequel

On April 27, 2016, it was announced that Netflix ordered a follow-up series entitled Wet Hot American Summer: Ten Years Later, set ten years after the events of the film.  The series consists of eight episodes, and was released on August 4, 2017.

Reception
Wet Hot American Summer: First Day of Camp received positive reviews from critics. On Rotten Tomatoes, the series has a score of 92%, based on 53 reviews, with an average rating of 7.44/10. The site's critical consensus reads, "Wet Hot American Summer: First Day of Camp offers more of the same goofy hijinks that fans of the cult classic crave, but outsiders might not be quite as enamored." On Metacritic, the series holds a score of 74 out of 100, based on 23 critics, indicating "generally favorable reviews".

For the 6th Critics' Choice Television Awards, John Slattery was nominated for Best Guest Performer in a Comedy Series.

References

External links
 
 

 
2010s American satirical television series
2010s American comedy television miniseries
2015 American television series debuts
2015 American television series endings
American prequel television series
Cultural depictions of Ronald Reagan
English-language Netflix original programming
Television series about summer camps
Live action television shows based on films
Television series set in the 1980s
Television shows set in Maine